"Rivers of Joy" is a song recorded by German pop group No Angels. It was written by Swedish composing duo Petterson & Haze, consisting of Hans Andersson and Niklas Petterson, and produced by Peter Ries for the band's debut studio album, Elle'ments, released in March 2001. An anthemic song about self-empowerment, the dance-pop track combines elements of gospel music and eurodance with prominent usage of a piano sample.

The composition was released as the album's second single in German-speaking Europe on 30 April 2001 upon the major success of debut single "Daylight in Your Eyes". The song reached the top ten in Germany and Switzerland. This however, made "Rivers of Joy" the lowest-charting single of the Elle'ments era, as both singles of the reissue charted significantly higher.

An accompanying music video for "Rivers of Joy" was directed by Robert Bröllochs and filmed in Groß-Gerau, Germany in early April 2001. It featured the group as marble statues, awakening to life in a museum of art.

Background 
"Rivers of Joy" was written by Swedish composing duo Petterson & Haze, consisting of Hans Andersson and Niklas Petterson, and produced and mixed by frequent No Angels collaborator, German musician Peter Ries, for Cheyenne Media. All music was recorded by Ries at DPB Studios in New York City. Ossi Schaller played the guitar, with Ulf Zwerger assisting in its audio engineering, while Dirk Kurock and Trevor Hurst served as Pro Tools editors. Martin Faulwasser and Mecx and their assistant Martin Zehetbauer oversaw the recording of the vocals at the Westpark Studios in Munich, with Popstars coach Robert Bicknell assisting in vocal coaching. Additional background vocals were provided by singers Gina Dunn, Joan Faulkner, and Charlemaine Thomas-Schmidtner, and were arranged by Ries.

Release and reception 
Selected as the album's second single by the group's records company, physical singles of "Rivers of Joy" were released on 30 April 2001 by Cheyenne Records. The maxi single includes several remixes of the song, as well as a Ries-produced Re-Supreme Remix of previous single "Daylight in Your Eyes", a voice message, and the previously unreleased record "What Am I Supposed to Do", produced by Soul-O-Matic and written by Harry Zier, Rob Hardt, and singer Senait Mehari.

Upon its release, "Rivers of Joy" debuted at number seven on the German Singles Chart in the week of 14 May 2001. It fell out of the top twenty in its seventh week and left the chart after eleven weeks, becoming the 86th highest-selling single of 2001 in Germany and sold more than 180.000 Copies. In Austria, the single debuted and peaked at number eleven on the Ö3 Austria Top 40. It remained two more weeks within the top twenty and spent twelve weeks within the top 75. In Switzerland, "Rivers of Joy" entered the Swiss Hitparade at number 25 in the week of 13 May, before climbing to number ten the following week. It spent 14 weeks on the chart. The song also reached number 30 on the Polish Airplay Charts.

Music video 
 
A music video for "Rivers of Joy" was filmed on 26 March 2001. No Angels reteamed with Robert Bröllochs, director of their debut video "Daylight in Your Eyes" (2001), who produced "Rivers of Joy" through his Camelot Filmproduktion. As with their previous video, filming took place at the X-Sight-Studios in Groß-Gerau near Darmstadt and lasted 20 hours. Similar to "Daylight in Your Eyes", most of the sequences in the CGI-heavy video were shot in front of a white background, while several computer animations required shoting in front of a bluescreen. Popstars coach Detlef Soost served as the choreographer again. Due to time constraints, the band was forced to learn his choreography in just six hours.

The visuals depict No Angels as marble statues in a museum of art. When the music starts, they come to life and leave their platforms. They start dancing and singing, and call several animal statues such as lions and elephants into being. The video for "Rivers of Joy" premiered in April 2001 on MTV Central's show Brand:Neu.

Track listings

Notes
 denotes additional producer

Credits and personnel
Credits adapted from the liner notes of Elle'ments.

Nadja Benaissa – vocals
Robert Bicknell – vocal coaching
Lucy Diakovska – vocals 
Gina Dunn – background vocals 
Joan Faulkner – background vocals 
Martin Faulwasser – vocal recording
Trevor Hurst – pro tool editing
J. Quincy Kramer – mastering
Dirk Kurock – pro tool editing

Sandy Mölling – vocals 
Vanessa Petruo – vocals 
Peter Ries – production, mixing, recording, instruments
Ossi Schaller – guitars
Charlemaine Thomas-Schmidtmer – background vocals 
Jessica Wahls – vocals 
Martin Zehetbauer – recording assistant engineer
Ulf Zwerger – guitar assistant engineer

Charts

Weekly charts

Year-end charts

References

External links

2001 singles
No Angels songs
Dance-pop songs
2001 songs
Polydor Records singles